Red Davis (1915–2002) was an American baseball player.

Red Davis may also refer to:

Red Davis (American football) (1907–1988), American football player
Red Davis (basketball) (born 1932), American basketball player

See Also
Redd Davis (1896–??), Canadian film director